The 2002–03 Syracuse Orangemen basketball team represented Syracuse University in NCAA men's basketball competition in the 2002–03 Division I season. The head coach was Jim Boeheim, serving for his 27th year. The team played its home games at the Carrier Dome in Syracuse, New York.  The team finished with a 30–5 (13–3) record, while capturing its first modern-era NCAA Championship.

The team had just one senior, guard Kueth Duany. He was joined in the starting lineup by forwards Hakim Warrick (sophomore), Carmelo Anthony (freshman), center Craig Forth (sophomore), and guard Gerry McNamara (freshman). Other key contributors included guards Josh Pace (sophomore) and Billy Edelin (freshman), and center Jeremy McNeil (junior).

Season recap
Things did not start well for Syracuse. Guards DeShaun Williams and James Thues both left the team. Williams transferred to Iona while Thues left for Detroit. Freshman point guard Billy Edelin was suspended for 12 games for participating in a non-sanctioned basketball league. Syracuse then started its season with a loss against Memphis, despite Carmelo Anthony's 27 points, a then-high for a Syracuse freshman debut.

But things turned around, as Syracuse went 13–3 in the Big East, with several memorable wins. McNamara would establish himself as a clutch player, nailing a game-winning 3-pointer as then-No. 17 Syracuse notched an 82–80 win over then-No. 10 Notre Dame in February. In an upset of then-No. 24 Syracuse over then-No. 2 Pittsburgh, McNeil, a career 49.1% free throw shooter, hit two key free throws, and added a game-winning tip in a 67–65 upset.

The Orangemen would play five Big 12 teams throughout the year, including games against Missouri in the regular season, and against Oklahoma (Elite Eight), Oklahoma State (second round), Texas (National Semifinal) and then Kansas (National Championship game).

In the championship game against Kansas, with Syracuse leading by three with under 15 seconds left, Warrick missed two free throws that would've sealed the game with Syracuse hanging on to a three-point lead, 81–78. With 1.5 seconds left and the score still the same, Kansas' Michael Lee was open on the baseline for a potential game-tying 3-pointer. But Warrick used his long arms to block Lee's attempt and Syracuse captured its first-ever national championship.

Coincidentally, the game was played in the Superdome in New Orleans, where Syracuse had lost the National Championship to Indiana in 1987 on a last-second shot by Keith Smart.

Schedule

|-
!colspan=12 style=| Regular season

|-
!colspan=12 style=| Big East tournament

|-
!colspan=12 style=| NCAA tournament

Roster

References

External links

Syracuse Orange
Syracuse Orange men's basketball seasons
NCAA Division I men's basketball tournament championship seasons
NCAA Division I men's basketball tournament Final Four seasons
Syracuse
Syracuse Orange men's b
Syracuse Orange men's b